The Qatari records in swimming are the fastest-ever performances by a swimmer from Qatar. These records are recognized and maintained by the Qatar Swimming Association (QSA).

Records are currently listed for the following events:
freestyle: 50, 100, 200, 400, 800 and 1500;
backstroke: 50, 100 and 200;
breaststroke: 50, 100 and 200;
butterfly: 50, 100 and 200;
individual medley: 100 (25m only), 200 and 400;
relays: 4x100 free, 4x200 free, and 4 × 100 medley.

All records were set in finals unless noted otherwise.

Long Course (50 m)

Men

Women

Short Course (25 m)

Men

Women

Notes

References
General
 Qatari Long Course records – Men 20 May 2022 updated
Specific

External links
QSA official web site

Qatar
Records
Swimming
Swimming